Puriya Dhanashree is a raga in Hindustani classical music. It belongs to the Purvi thaat and has been derived from the defining raga of that thaat – Raga Purvi.

The notes of Puriya Danashree correspond, in Western terms, to the double harmonic scale with an augmented fourth.

Structure

Raga Purvi, the "type-raga" of the Purvi thaat contains all seven notes (i.e. Shadaj, Rishabh, Gandhar, Madhyam, Pancham, Dhaivat and Nishad). But the rishabh and the dhaivat are komal both in ascent and descent and the madhyam varies from teevra to shuddh whereas the gandhar and the nishaad stay shuddh throughout.

In Puriya Dhanashree, however, the aarohan or the ascent is as follows - -N r G M d N S+. This shows that pancham is not used very often in the aarohan thereby making it a shaadav aarohan or an aarohan with six notes. Rishabh and Dhaivat are komal or flat in Raag Puriya Dhanashree wheres the Madhyam is teevra or sharp. The descent or the avarohan is as follows: S+ N d P M G M r G r S, the descent bears all seven notes with komal Dhaivat and Shadaj and a teevra Madhyam. The vadi of this raga is pancham and the samavadi is rishabh. Raag Purvi's structure is very close to that of raga Puriya Dhanashree therefore in order to differentiate between the two shuddha madhyam is often used in raga purvi unlike the teevra madhayam used in raga Puriya Dhanashree.

The gayan samay or the time of singing this raga is at dusk. Raag Puriya Dhanashree is sung at time of transition from the afternoon to the evening and thus it is known as a Sandhiprakash Raga. The pakad of this Raga or the catch phrase of this Raga under the Bhatkande system is -N r G, M r G P, M d P, M G M r G d M G r S . While expounding the uttaranga part of this Raga the phrase M d N d S+ is used to move into the taara saptak (higher octave). The transition from the taara saptak Re to the Madhya Saptak Ni is commonly through the use of a meendh.

Raga-Rasa Theory

Each sruti or micro tonal interval has a definite character; the names manda, candovati, dayavati, ranjani, raudri, krodha, ugra or khsobhini denote their emotional quality which dwells in combination or singly in the notes of the modal scale: thus, dayavati, ranjani and ratika dwell in the gandhara and each of the notes ( swara ) of the scale in its turn has its own kind of expression and distinct psychological or physical effect and can be related to a colour, a mood ( rasa or bhava ), a metre, a deity or one of the subtle centres ( chakra ) of the body. ...Thus for the sringara  (amorous or erotic) and the hasya  (laughter) rasa, the madhyama and the pancham are used; for the vira  (heroic), raudra  (wrathful) and the adbhuta  (wondrous), the shadja and the rishabha ; for the bibhatsa  (repulsive) and the bhayanaka  (fearsome), the dhaivata ; and for the karuna  (compassionate), the nisada and the gandhara are used. Every swara stands for a certain definite emotion or mood and has been classified according to its relative importance, and it forms a different part of the `person' of the modal scale.

Recordings

Pt. Ravi Shankar, on India's Master Musician, World Pacific Records, 1959 (as Raga Puriya Dhanashri)

Pt. Bhimsen Joshi, on Raga Miyan Ki Todi/Raga Puriya Dhanashri, His Master's Voice, 1963 (as Raga Puriya Dhanashri)

Pt. Pran Nath, on Palace Theatre, Paris 1972, Volume II, Sri Moonshine Music, 2017 (as Raag Puriyaa Dhanaashree)

Film Songs

Language: Tamil
Note that songs are composed in the Carnatic ragam Pantuvarāḷi,, which Puriya Dhanashree sounds similar to.

External links
Film Songs in Rag Puriya Dhanashree
 More details about raga PooriaDhanashri

Dhb